Detron Nigel Smith (born February 25, 1974) is a former American football fullback in the NFL. After his college career at Texas A&M University, he moved to the NFL and played primarily for the Denver Broncos. He was selected to the Pro Bowl in 1999.

High school and college
Smith was a consensus Texas Top 100 selection at Lake Highlands High School in Dallas, Texas and was rated the second-best fullback prospect in the Southwest, receiving a perfect score of 10 points on Max Emfinger's Blue Chip List. During his career at Lake Highlands, he carried the ball 181 times for 1,351 yards (7.5 yards per carry) and scored 15 touchdowns.

Smith was primarily a blocking back during his career at Texas A&M, creating holes for future NFL running backs Rodney Thomas, Greg Hill, and Leeland McElroy. He rushed 57 times for 184 yards (3.2 yards per carry) and one touchdown, while catching 33 passes for 300 yards (9.1 yards per catch) with a long of 35 yards. Smith also returned five kickoffs for 54 yards. During his first two years at A&M (1992–93), Smith's running backs coach was his future Broncos offensive coordinator and current Denver Broncos head coach Gary Kubiak. Smith made a key block on a McElroy touchdown in the 1993 game against Texas that secured the Southwest Conference title for the Aggies.

NFL
Smith was the first blocking fullback selected when he was drafted in the 3rd round (65th overall) of the 1996 NFL Draft by the Denver Broncos, and the second true fullback behind only Tampa Bay's Mike Alstott. In April 2002, after six seasons in Denver, Smith was signed by the Jacksonville Jaguars. However, he was released before making an appearance and played for the Indianapolis Colts in 2002 and 2003. He was released by the Colts in early 2004.

During his tenure in the NFL, Smith was known as a high energy player who would sacrifice his body on blocking and special teams alike. With both the Broncos and Indianapolis Colts, Smith instantly became a fan favorite with his big hits on special teams and willingness to do the little things. In total, he played in 113 games over 8 seasons, highlighted by his selection to the Pro Bowl 1999 and two Super Bowl rings won with the Broncos (Super Bowl XXXII in 1997 and Super Bowl XXXIII in 1998).

References

External links
 ESPN page

1974 births
Living people
Players of American football from Dallas
American football fullbacks
Texas A&M Aggies football players
Denver Broncos players
Indianapolis Colts players
American Conference Pro Bowl players